The 2021–22 season is the club's second season since the merger of the brand of ATK FC with Mohun Bagan AC in 2020, and their second season in the Indian Super League. The club though initially participated in the 123rd edition of the Calcutta Football League, later withdrew before the start of their campaign.

Summary

June 
The club began the season with the signing of Hyderabad FC player Liston Colaco for an undisclosed fee, which is believed to be around $161,000. Finnish midfielder Joni Kauko became their next signing which was completed just a few days after Finland were knocked out of the UEFA Euro 2020.

July 
On 8 July, the club announced the signing of Hugo Boumous from Mumbai City FC on a record transfer fee which is believed to be $280,000 in a first time ever in India, a 5-year deal. On the other hand, ATK Mohun Bagan defender Sandesh Jhingan moved to Croatia after agreeing to a free transfer deal with HNK Šibenik.

August 
The 21 men squad for the campaign was announced on 14 August. The four foreigners in the squad were revealed to be Carl McHugh, Hugo Boumous, Roy Krishna and David Williams. ATK Mohun Bagan reached Malé on 15 August and kicked-off their AFC Cup 2021 campaign on 18 August with a victory against their domestic rivals Bengaluru FC by 2–0 as captain Krishna and Bose found the back of the net. They registered their second victory of the tournament with a win over Maziya S&RC by 3–1. The team produced a 1–1 draw against Bashundhara Kings to advance to the inter-zone semi-final of AFC Cup. ATK Mohun Bagan was set to start their 2021–22 CFL Premier Division A campaign on 29 August against George Telegraph SC but the club, on 28 August, officially informed IFA (WB) that they would skip CFL, due to the clash of AFC Cup inter-zone playoff semi-final occurring on 22 September with the CFL matches. The club also found the risk of having players either injured or getting COVID-19 positive due the lack of bio bubbles in the CFL, moreover the foreign players had already returned to their respective countries, and few domestic players got selected to represent India in the 2021 SAFF Championship. Meanwhile Antonio Habas returned home in Spain and said the need of a break for the players was essential after the AFC Cup group stage matches involving intense and painstaking work in 7 days. Therefore, all the teams were given walkover against ATK Mohun Bagan in the CFL.

September 
The club mutually agreed to terminate the contract of their first choice goalkeeper, Arindam Bhattacharya, who also won the Golden Glove in the previous season, and moved to their city rivals, SC East Bengal. The team flew to Dubai on 11 September for a six-day training camp to train and acclimatise for the upcoming match in Qarshi. The only major change in the squad was Boumous replaced by Kauko after suffering an injury. On 22 September, ATK Mohun Bagan ended their AFC Cup campaign with a heavy defeat of 0–6 against FC Nasaf Qarshi in the inter-zonal semi-final, thus equaled Mohun Bagan's worst defeat record in AFC Cup.

October 
ATK Mohun Bagan began their pre-season training camp in Goa on 18 October.

November 
On 19 November, the club began its 2021–22 ISL season with a high scoring win of 4–2 against Kerala Blasters FC as Boumous scored a brace, while Krishna and Colaco scored a goal each. The team also achieved the Derby win in its second matchday.

December 
ATK Mohun Bagan had its biggest defeat in ISL until then, on their third matchday against Mumbai City FC by 5–1. The effect of the big setback continued as the team lost the next match against Jamshedpur FC and drew the matches against Chennaiyin FC and Bengaluru FC. On 18 December, Habas announced his resignation from the duties as the team's head coach. After a numerous speculations, on the next evening, FC Goa president announced that their serving head coach, Juan Ferrando had decided to join ATK Mohun Bagan, through a buy-out clause. This move made him the highest paid coach in the ISL and also set a new record in the Indian football transfer history. Ferrando joined the camp on 21 December and faced NorthEast United FC the same evening, which ended with his first win as the ATK Mohun Bagan head coach. Boumous became the first ISL player to feature in FIFA Ultimate Team of the Week as he got placed in the TOTW15.

January 
During the club's first match of 2022, Williams set the record for the fastest goal in the ISL history by scoring against Hyderabad FC at 12 seconds, but the match ended with a draw. Jhingan returned as the club's first signing during the winter transfer window. The next match, against Odisha FC, was postponed as one of the players of ATK Mohun Bagan, reportedly Krishna, tested COVID-19 positive on the matchday. The following matches against Bengaluru FC and Kerala Blasters FC were suspended as well due to numerous positive cases among the clubs. The team resumed play on 23 January with their rescheduled match against Odisha FC, that ended in a goalless draw. Before the second Derby of the season, the club announced the arrival of veteran Indian goalkeeper Subrata Paul on loan from Hyderabad FC. Tiri became the first foreigner to make 100 appearances in ISL as he started for the Derby. Kiyan Nassiri became the youngest goalscorer of the club and the youngest hattrick scorer of ISL at the age of 21 years 2 months and 12 days, as he led his team to a Derby win by two goals margin. This was the fifth Derby win in a row in all competitions since 2019.

February
A revised schedule of the league was released for the previously postponed matches as well as all the matches from 9 February onwards. The team extended their unbeaten run with wins against Hyderabad FC, NorthEast United FC, FC Goa and Benguluru FC, and draws against Mumbai City FC, Kerala Blasters FC and Odisha FC.

March
ATK Mohun Bagan qualified for the ISL playoffs by beating Chennaiyin FC and also matched FC Goa's 15 matches unbeaten record in ISL. On the final matchday, with at least a two goals margin win required to become the ISL Premiers, the team lost against Jamshedpur FC and finished 3rd in the league table. In the 1st leg of semifinal, ATK Mohun Bagan suffered a heavy defeat of 3–1 against Hyderabad, and in the 2nd leg, the team won by 1–0 but failed to win by aggregate score.

April
ATK Mohun Bagan began their preparations for the upcoming continental games at their home venue, Kolkata from 1 April. After relaxation in the registration limits of foreigners in 2021, the club could include all of their foreigners in their squad. The team qualified for the AFC Cup group stage by convincingly beating Blue Star SC and Abahani Ltd. Dhaka in the qualifying stage.

May
On 2 May the AIFF announced the dates for India's friendly games in May, among which a match against ATK Mohun Bagan was also scheduled on 11 May, which was decided as a preparatory match for the club's upcoming AFC Cup group stage campaign. The team played the friendlies against 2021–22 Santosh Trophy runners-up West Bengal on 5 May and India on the scheduled date. In the opening match of AFC Cup Group D, ATK Mohun Bagan suffered a loss of 4–2 against Gokulam Kerala FC. The team got back and cruised past Bashundhara Kings and Maziya S&RC with dominating performances to qualify for the inter-zone play-off semi-final.

Players

Transfers

In

Out

Competitions

Overview

2021 AFC Cup

Group stage

Group table

Matches

Knockout stage

Match

Indian Super League

League table

Result summary

Results by round 
To preserve chronological evolvements, the postponed matches are not included to the round at which it was originally scheduled, but added to the full round they were played immediately afterwards. For example, if the match which was previously scheduled for round 10, but then played between rounds 11 and 12, it was added to the standings for round 11.

Matches

ISL Playoffs

Matches

2022 AFC Cup

Qualifying stage

Matches

Group stage

Group table

Matches

Friendlies

Statistics

Notes

References

ATK Mohun Bagan FC seasons
2021–22 Indian Super League season by team